Sumy Oblast is subdivided into districts (raions) which are subdivided into territorial communities (hromadas).

Current

On 18 July 2020, the number of districts was reduced to five. These are:
 Konotop (Конотопський район), the center is in the town of Konotop;
 Okhtyrka (Охтирський район), the center is in the town of Okhtyrka;
 Romny (Роменський район), the center is in the town of Romny; 
 Shostka (Шосткинський район), the center is in the town of Shostka;
 Sumy (Сумський район), the center is in the city of Sumy.

Administrative divisions until 2020

Before 2020, Sumy Oblast was subdivided into 24 regions: 17 districts (raions) and 7 city municipalities (mis'krada or misto), officially known as territories governed by city councils.

Cities under the oblast's jurisdiction:
Sumy Municipality 
Cities and towns under the city's jurisdiction:
Sumy (Суми), the administrative center of the oblast
Hlukhiv Municipality 
Cities and towns under the city's jurisdiction:
Hlukhiv (Глухів)
Konotop Municipality 
Cities and towns under the city's jurisdiction:
Konotop (Конотоп)
Lebedyn Municipality 
Cities and towns under the city's jurisdiction:
Lebedyn (Лебедин)
Okhtyrka Municipality 
Cities and towns under the city's jurisdiction:
Okhtyrka (Охтирка)
Romny Municipality 
Cities and towns under the city's jurisdiction:
Romny (Ромни)
Shostka (Шостка)
Districts (raions):
Bilopillia  (Білопільський район)
Cities and towns under the district's jurisdiction:
Bilopillia (Білопілля)
Vorozhba (Ворожба)
Urban-type settlements under the district's jurisdiction:
Mykolaivka (Миколаївка), formerly Zhovtneve
Ulianivka (Улянівка)
Buryn  (Буринський район)
Cities and towns under the district's jurisdiction:
Buryn (Буринь)
Hlukhiv  (Глухівський район)
Urban-type settlements under the district's jurisdiction:
Esman (Есмань), formerly Chervone
Shalyhyne (Шалигине)
Konotop  (Конотопський район)
Urban-type settlements under the district's jurisdiction:
Duboviazivka (Дубов'язівка)
Krasnopillia  (Краснопільський район)
Urban-type settlements under the district's jurisdiction:
Krasnopillia (Краснопілля)
Uhroidy (Угроїди)
Krolevets  (Кролевецький район)
Cities and towns under the district's jurisdiction:
Krolevets (Кролевець)
Lebedyn  (Лебединський район)
Lypova Dolyna  (Липоводолинський район)
Urban-type settlements under the district's jurisdiction:
Lypova Dolyna (Липова Долина)
Nedryhailiv  (Недригайлівський район)
Urban-type settlements under the district's jurisdiction:
Nedryhailiv (Недригайлів)
Terny (Терни)
Okhtyrka  (Охтирський район)
Urban-type settlements under the district's jurisdiction:
Chupakhivka (Чупахівка)
Putyvl  (Путивльський район)
Cities and towns under the district's jurisdiction:
Putyvl (Путивль)
Romny  (Роменський район)
Seredyna-Buda  (Середино-Будський район)
Cities and towns under the district's jurisdiction:
Seredyna-Buda (Середина-Буда)
Urban-type settlements under the district's jurisdiction:
Znob-Novhorodske (Зноб-Новгородське)
Shostka  (Шосткинський район)
Urban-type settlements under the district's jurisdiction:
Voronizh (Вороніж)
Sumy  (Сумський район)
Urban-type settlements under the district's jurisdiction:
Khotin (Хотінь)
Nyzy (Низи)
Stepanivka (Степанівка)
Trostianets  (Тростянецький район)
Cities and towns under the district's jurisdiction:
Trostianets (Тростянець)
Velyka Pysarivka  (Великописарівський район)
Urban-type settlements under the district's jurisdiction:
Kyrykivka (Кириківка)
Velyka Pysarivka (Велика Писарівка)
Yampil  (Ямпільський район)
Cities and towns under the district's jurisdiction:
Druzhba (Дружба)
Urban-type settlements under the district's jurisdiction:
Svesa (Свеса)
Yampil (Ямпіль)

References

Sumy
Sumy Oblast